"High Pressure Low" is the third single from Against Me!'s fifth studio album White Crosses, released as a 7" vinyl single on December 21, 2010 on Sabot Productions.

Background
Following the recording their fifth studio album, White Crosses, Against Me! recorded acoustic versions of songs written for the album in February 2010. An acoustic version of "High Pressure Low" was known to be recorded following lead singer Laura Jane Grace's video posts regarding the acoustic sessions. Grace performed the b-side, "Strip Mall Parking Lots" as early as her 2008 solo tour, then thought to be called "Southwest Florida Sunset".

Track listing

Personnel

Band
 Laura Jane Grace – guitar, lead vocals, backing vocals
 James Bowman – guitar, backing vocals
 Andrew Seward – bass guitar, backing vocals
 George Rebelo – drums, backing vocals, backing instruments

Production
 Produced and mixed by Against Me!
 Recorded by Derron Nuhfer

See also
Against Me! discography

References

2010 singles
Against Me! songs
Songs written by Laura Jane Grace
2010 songs